KASB Bank was a Pakistani bank which was founded by Khadim Ali Shah Bukhari. The bank was headquartered in Karachi, Pakistan. It is worked under the KASB Group of Companies. KASB Group is the oldest capital markets business in Pakistan, established in 1952 by Mr. Khadim Ali Shah Bukhari. KASB Group has business interests in financial services ([http://www.kasb.com KASB Securities], KTrade, KASB Modarba), Real Estate (KASB Tower), Education (KASB Institute of Technology), agriculture and media (Play TV).

On 7 May 2015, the bank merged with Bank Islami due to financial difficulties.

References

External links 

 KASB Bank's official site

Defunct banks of Pakistan
Pakistani companies established in 1994
Banks established in 1994
Banks with year of disestablishment missing
Mergers and acquisitions of Pakistani companies
Banks disestablished in 2015
Pakistani companies disestablished in 2015